Ruth Barrows Chorpenning Norris (born February 11, 1898 –  died after 1977) was an American stage actress and monologuist. She originated the character "Ado Annie" in Green Grow the Lilacs.

Early life and education 
Chorpenning was born in Springfield, Ohio and raised in Colorado and Minnesota, the daughter of John C. Chorpenning and Charlotte Barrows Chorpenning. Her mother was a teacher, poet, and playwright. She survived spinal meningitis as a baby, and her father died of tuberculosis when she was a teen. She graduated from Radcliffe College in 1920, and from the School of the Theatre in 1922.

Career 

Chorpenning appeared on Broadway in the shows The Jolly Roger (1923), Cyrano de Bergerac (1923, 1926), Charley's Aunt (1925), Sam Abramovitch (1927), Hot Pan (1928), Him (1928), Dorian Gray (1928), The International (1928), Fiesta (1929), Red Rust (1929), The Garrick Gaieties (1930), Green Grow the Lilacs (1931), Lost Boy (1932), Jamboree (1932), Marathon (1933), Ah, Wilderness! (1933), The Puritan (1936), Swing Your Lady (1936), Sun Kissed (1937), Love in My Fashion (1937), Family Portrait (1939), and Ring Around Elizabeth (1941). Caricature artist Al Hirschfeld sketched Chorpenning with other cast members of The Garrick Gaieties in 1930.

Beyond her Broadway career, Chorpenning choreographed and performed at a May Day pageant at Ohio State University in 1916. She worked with her husband on community theatre projects for the Eastern Cooperative League, the University of Louisville School of Social Work, and the Federal Negro Theatre.  In 1942 she played all the roles in an NBC radio serial written her husband, titled Brownstone Front.

Publications 

 "Romey and Julie": A Romantic Comedy (1936, with Robert Dunmore, James Norris, and Margaret Bonds)
 "Recreation in Cooperatives" (1943)

Personal life 
Chorpenning married fellow actor and playwright James Norris. In the 1970s she and her husband lived in Florida, and gave interviews to two scholars researching Charlotte Chorpenning for their dissertations.

References

External links 

 
 
 Vandamm, "Ruth Chorpenning as Ado Annie Carnes" (1931 photograph), in the New York Public Library Digital Collections
 Lucas-Monroe, "Ruth Chorpenning as Vida and Herbert Yost as Hubert Cherry in Ring Around Elizabeth" (1941 photograph), in the Museum of the City of New York

1898 births

Year of death missing
Date of death missing
People from Springfield, Ohio
Radcliffe College alumni
American actresses